Clonixin is a nonsteroidal anti-inflammatory drug (NSAID). It also has analgesic, antipyretic, and platelet-inhibitory actions. It is used primarily in the treatment of chronic arthritic conditions and certain soft tissue disorders associated with pain and inflammation.

Synthesis

Clonixeril
The glyceryl ester of clonixin, clonixeril, is also an NSAID. It was prepared by a somewhat roundabout method.

Clonixin was reacted with chloroacetonitrile and triethylamine to give 2. Heating with potassium carbonate and glycerol acetonide displaced the activating group to produce ester 3, which was deblocked in acetic acid to produce clonixeril (4).

See also
Flunixin
Clonixeril

References 

Nonsteroidal anti-inflammatory drugs
Chloroarenes
Aminopyridines
Anilines
Aromatic acids